André Hoffmann (born 11 August 1961) is a former German Speed skater who made a huge step forwards in the 1987–1988 season and won two 1500 metres races in the World Cup. It was even though highly surprising that he took gold medal in the 1500 m at the 1988 Olympics in Calgary. He beat the American Eric Flaim with six hundreds of a second and set a new world record with 1:52.06.

World records 

Source: SpeedSkatingStats.com

References

External links
Photos of André Hoffmann
André Hoffmann at SpeedSkatingStats.com

German male speed skaters
Olympic speed skaters of East Germany
Olympic gold medalists for East Germany
Speed skaters at the 1984 Winter Olympics
Speed skaters at the 1988 Winter Olympics
Speed skaters from Berlin
People from East Berlin
1961 births
Living people
Olympic medalists in speed skating
World record setters in speed skating
Medalists at the 1988 Winter Olympics